The President of the Republic of Kazakhstan's Cup is an annual pre-season ice hockey tournament held in Nur-Sultan, Kazakhstan. The tournament was first held in 2010 by the initiative of the president of Kazakhstan Nursultan Nazarbayev. The event is hosted by the KHL team Barys Astana and played each year in August. Currently, all games are held at Kazakhstan Sports Palace.

Winners

References

External links

 Archive of Hockey Results

Sport in Astana
International ice hockey competitions hosted by Kazakhstan